Double hashing is a computer programming technique used in conjunction with open addressing in hash tables to resolve hash collisions, by using a secondary hash of the key as an offset when a collision occurs. Double hashing with open addressing is a classical data structure on a table .

The double hashing technique uses one hash value as an index into the table and then repeatedly steps forward an interval until the desired value is located, an empty location is reached, or the entire table has been searched; but this interval is set by a second, independent hash function. Unlike the alternative collision-resolution methods of linear probing and quadratic probing, the interval depends on the data, so that values mapping to the same location have different bucket sequences; this minimizes repeated collisions and the effects of clustering.

Double hashing approximates a random distribution; more precisely, pair-wise independent hash functions yield a probability of  that any pair of keys will follow the same bucket sequence.

Selection of h2(k)
The secondary hash function  should have several characteristics:
it should never yield an index of zero
it should cycle through the whole table
it should be very fast to compute
it should be pair-wise independent of 
It is analogous to a random-number generator.
 All  be relatively prime to |T|.

In practice:
 If division hashing is used for both functions, the divisors are chosen as primes.
 If the T is a power of 2, the first and last requirements are usually satisfied by making  always return an odd number. This has the side effect of doubling the chance of collision due to one wasted bit.

Analysis 

Given a key , the -st hash location is computed by:

Let  have fixed load factor .
Bradford and Katehakis
Pair-wise independence of the hash functions suffices.

Like all other forms of open addressing, double hashing becomes linear as the hash table approaches maximum capacity. The usual heuristic is to limit the table loading to 75% of capacity.  Eventually, rehashing to a larger size will be necessary, as with all other open addressing schemes.

Variants 

Triple hashing 
Adding a quadratic term   (a triangular number) or even  (triple hashing) to the hash function improves the hash function somewhat but does not fix this problem; if:
 
  and
 
then

Enhanced double hashing 

This can be computed efficiently by forward differencing:
struct key;	/// Opaque
/// Use other data types when needed. (Must be unsigned for guaranteed wrapping.)
extern unsigned int h1(struct key const *), h2(struct key const *);

/// Calculate k hash values from two underlying hash functions
/// h1() and h2() using enhanced double hashing.  On return,
///     hashes[i] = h1(x) + i*h2(x) + (i*i*i - i)/6.
/// Takes advantage of automatic wrapping (modular reduction)
/// of unsigned types in C.
void ext_dbl_hash(struct key const *x, unsigned int hashes[], unsigned int n)
{
	unsigned int a = h1(x), b = h2(x), i;

	for (i = 0; i < n; i++) { 
		hashes[i] = a;
		a += b;	// Add quadratic difference to get cubic
		b += i;	// Add linear difference to get quadratic
		       	// i++ adds constant difference to get linear
	}
}

In addition to rectifying the collision problem, enhanced double hashing also removes double-hashing's numerical restrictions on 's properties, allowing a hash function similar in property to (but still independent of)  to be used.

See also
 Cuckoo hashing
 2-choice hashing

References

External links
How Caching Affects Hashing by Gregory L. Heileman and Wenbin Luo 2005.
Hash Table Animation
klib a C library that includes double hashing functionality.

Search algorithms
Hashing